Billie may refer to:

People 
 Billie Allen (1925-2015), American actress
 Billie Bird (1908-2002), American actress and comedian
 Billie Burke (1884-1970), American actress 
 Billie Joe Armstrong (born 1972), American singer and guitarist for the band Green Day
 Billie Dove (1903–1997), American actress
 Billie Eilish (born 2001), American singer-songwriter
 Billie Fleming (1914–2014), British long-distance cycling record-holder
 Billie Frechette (1907–1969), American Métis singer, waitress, convict, and lecturer known for her relationship with the bank robber John Dillinger
 Billie Holiday (1915–1959), American jazz singer
 Billie Kay (born 1989), Australian professional wrestler
 Billie Jean King (born 1943), American professional tennis player and gender equality advocate
 Billie Lourd (born 1992), American actress
 Billie Moore (1943–2022), American basketball coach
 Billie Mae Richards (1921-2010), Canadian actress
 Billie Piper (born 1982), British singer and actress, who first recorded under the name Billie
 Billie Pitcheneder (1916–2002), Australian community worker
 Billie Shepherd (born 1990), British television personality
 Billie Jo Spears (1937–2011), American country music singer
 Billie Whitelaw (1932-2014), British actress

Other 
 Billie (1965 film), a 1965 film starring Patty Duke
 Billie (2019 film), a documentary about Billie Holiday
 Billie club or baton, a weapon often used by law enforcement
 MV Billie, an Ecuadorian coaster
 "Billie", a song by Pavement from Terror Twilight
 Billlie, a South Korean girl group

See also 

 
 Billy (disambiguation)
 Bili (disambiguation)
 Bill (disambiguation)